The Bras d'Or was a summer passenger train service operated by Via Rail in Nova Scotia, Canada, between Halifax and Sydney. From 2000 to 2004, the excursion train ran one round-trip per week in the tourist season of mid-June to mid-October. The route followed the scenic Sydney Subdivision of the Cape Breton and Central Nova Scotia Railway across Cape Breton Island, at times within view of Bras d'Or Lake, after which the train is named.

The Bras d'Or was the last regularly-scheduled passenger train serving Cape Breton Island.

References

Named passenger trains of Canada
Railway services introduced in 2000
Railway services discontinued in 2004
Former Via Rail routes
Passenger rail transport in Nova Scotia